Jesus Urge Superstar is the debut studio album by the alternative rock band Urge Overkill. It was released in 1989. The album is noted for its ironic 1970s-worshipping aesthetic.

"Very Sad Trousers" is about the band Royal Trux.

Critical reception
Trouser Press called the album "awful-sounding," writing that "the murk of thick mid-tempo guitar rock does nothing to prove the existence of songs, much less any audible trace of junk-culture devotion." The Spin Alternative Record Guide described it as "grinding guitars, distant, shouted vocals, and resolutely unfriendly subject matter." The Washington Post wrote that "Nate [sic] Kato's squalling high-end guitar has a certain delicacy to it and the trio's harmonies achieve a rough, yearning beauty."

Track listing
All songs written by Nash Kato and Eddie "King" Roeser. 
"God Flintstone"—5:08
"Very Sad Trousers"—3:29
"Your Friend is Insane"—6:01
"Dump Dump Dump"—3:07
"Last Train to Heaven"—3:42
"The Polaroid Doll"—2:30
"Head On"—4:11
"Crown of Laffs"—3:54
"Dubbledead"—5:29
"Easter '88"—1:07

References

Urge Overkill albums
1989 debut albums